Choi Cheol-han is a South Korean professional Go player. He is the fourth youngest (12 years 2 months) to become a professional Go player in South Korean history behind Cho Hun-hyun (9 years 7 months), Lee Chang-ho (11 years 1 months) and Cho Hye-yeon (11 years 10 months). His nickname is "The Viper".

Biography 
Choi became a professional when he was 12 years old. He began playing Go at the age of seven, studying with Lee Sedol in Kweon Kab-yong's academy in Seoul. At that time, Choi was considered the next Lee Sedol.

Promotion record

Career Record 
2006: 58 wins, 29 losses
2007: 45 wins, 25 losses
2008: 50 wins, 18 losses
2009: 56 wins, 18 losses
2010: 63 wins, 22 losses
2011: 50 wins, 24 losses

Titles and Runners-up 

Ranks tenth in total number of titles in Korea.

Korean Baduk League

Chinese A League

Head-to-head record vs selected players
  
Players who have won international go titles in bold.

 Lee Changho 31:30
 Lee Sedol 20:32
 Park Yeonghun 19:22
 Won Seongjin 18:11
 Mok Jinseok 18:8
 Kang Dongyun 12:11
 Kim Jiseok 11:12
 Chen Yaoye 9:11
 Cho Hanseung 9:11
 Gu Li 8:12
 Park Junghwan 6:12
 An Choyoung 11:5
 Cho Hunhyun 12:2
 Heo Youngho 10:4
 Lee Younggu 9:5
 Chang Hao 6:7
 Shi Yue 6:7
 Yoo Changhyuk 8:4
 Kong Jie 7:5
 Mi Yuting 5:7
 Hong Seongji 8:3
 Yun Junsang 8:3
 Zhou Ruiyang 8:3
 Peng Quan 7:4

References 

1985 births
Living people
South Korean Go players
Asian Games medalists in go
Go players at the 2010 Asian Games
Asian Games gold medalists for South Korea
Asian Games bronze medalists for South Korea
Medalists at the 2010 Asian Games